Trac is a software tool for project management.

Trac or TRAC may also refer to:
 TRAC (programming language), a string-oriented programming language
 Tuition Reform Action Coalition, a student advocacy group
 Telsiz ve Radyo Amatörleri Cemiyeti, an amateur radio organization in Turkey
 Team Racing Auto Circuit, a defunct auto racing series
 United States Army Training and Doctrine Command Analysis Center, an analysis agency that conducts research on potential military operations worldwide
 Transactional Records Access Clearinghouse, a data gathering, data research and data distribution organization at Syracuse University.
 Trustworthy Repositories Audit & Certification, an initiative to certify data repositories
 Three Rivers Athletic Conference, an Ohio high school athletic conference
 trac: Music Traditions Wales, the folk development organisation for Wales
 Theoretical Roman Archaeology Conference, annual Roman archaeology conference
 Transitional and Coastal Waters, a surface water classification used in the EU Water Framework Directive
 Cirrus TRAC Trainer, a training version of the Cirrus SR20/SR22 series of general aviation light aircraft